Gregory Milmore Poehler (born October 11, 1974) is an American actor, comedian, producer, writer, and attorney. He created and starred in the Swedish sitcom Welcome to Sweden.

Early life
Poehler was born in Boston and raised in Burlington, Massachusetts. He is the son of high school teachers Eileen Frances (née Milmore) and William Grinstead Poehler. His older sister is actress and comedian Amy Poehler. Poehler earned a Bachelor of Arts from Boston College in 1996 before attending the Fordham University School of Law, where he earned a Juris Doctor. He was admitted to the New York and Massachusetts bar associations and the United States Federal Courts for the Southern District of New York and the Fourth Circuit Court of Appeals. Finding success as a stand-up comedian, he left his day job as a lawyer to pursue a full-time career in show business, in large part influenced by his sister.

In 2006, Poehler graduated from Stockholm University with a masters in European intellectual property law.

Career
After graduating from law school, Poehler moved to the West Village of Manhattan and worked as an attorney in New York City and Sweden where he specialized in intellectual property law.

After twelve years as an attorney, in 2012 Poehler started doing stand-up comedy in Sweden. At the same time, he began writing the script for what became his first TV series, Welcome to Sweden in which he plays the lead part. In addition to acting he has roles as head writer and producer. His sister, Amy Poehler decided to produce the show after proofreading the script. He also starred in You Me Her, a TV series about a three-way romantic relationship.

Personal life
Poehler moved to Stockholm with Charlotta Meder, his Swedish girlfriend, in 2006 before they married. They have three children.

Filmography

Other

References

External links

1974 births
21st-century American male actors
American emigrants to Sweden
American male film actors
American male television actors
Television producers from Massachusetts
American television writers
American male television writers
Boston College alumni
Fordham University School of Law alumni
Living people
Male actors from Boston
Male actors from Stockholm
Massachusetts lawyers
New York (state) lawyers
People from Burlington, Massachusetts
Stockholm University alumni
Showrunners
Writers from Boston
American expatriates in Sweden
Screenwriters from Massachusetts
People from Greenwich Village